Mrs. Mike is a 1949 American drama film directed by Louis King and written by DeWitt Bodeen and Alfred Lewis Levitt. The film stars Dick Powell, Evelyn Keyes, J. M. Kerrigan, Angela Clarke, Will Wright and Nan Boardman. The film was released on December 23, 1949, by United Artists.

Plot
A young Boston woman, Kathy O'Fallon, travels north to visit her Uncle John at his cabin near the Canada–US border. While there she meets Mike Flannigan, a sergeant with the Canadian Royal North-West Mounted Police, and before long they're in love. Kathy marries Mike, who takes her by dogsled to his outpost in the cold, remote north.

Life is harsh there, particularly during the winters. A tightly knit community counts on Mike in ways that go far beyond normal police business. But he is away when a pregnant Kathy begins to worry about giving birth in such a primitive environment. Neighbors help deliver Mary, a baby girl, but surviving in the wilderness is extremely difficult, and the child dies during a diphtheria epidemic. Kathy makes up her mind to return to Boston, but realizes that she still loves and can't leave Mike.

Cast 
Dick Powell as Sgt. Mike Flannigan
Evelyn Keyes as Kathy O'Fallon Flannigan
J. M. Kerrigan as Uncle John
Angela Clarke as Sarah Carpentier
Will Wright as Dr. McIntosh
Nan Boardman as Georgette Beauclaire
Clarence Straight as Cameron
Frances Morris as Mrs. Howard
John Miljan as Mr. Howard
Joel Nestler as Pierre Carpentier
Jean Inness as Mrs. Mathers
Chief Yowlachie as Atenou
Fred Aldrich as Louis Beauclaire
Gary Lee Jackson as Tommy Henderson
Romere Darling as Mrs. Henderson
Archie Leonard as Trader Jim Henderson
James Fairfax as Danny Hawkins
Robin Camp as Tommy Howard 
Don Pietro as Joe Howard
Janet Sackett as Madeleine Beauclaire
Judith Sackett as Barbette Beauclaire

Comic book adaption
 Eastern Color Movie Love #1 (February 1950)

References

External links
 

1949 films
American black-and-white films
United Artists films
1949 drama films
American drama films
Films directed by Louis King
Films scored by William Lava
Northern (genre) films
Royal Canadian Mounted Police in fiction
Films adapted into comics
1940s English-language films
1940s American films